A legislative session is the period of time in which a legislature, in both parliamentary and presidential systems, is convened for purpose of lawmaking, usually being one of two or more smaller divisions of the entire time between two elections. In each country the procedures for opening, ending, and in between sessions differs slightly. A session may last for the full term of the legislature or the term may consist of a number of sessions. These may be of fixed duration, such as a year, or may be used as a parliamentary procedural device. A session of the legislature is brought to an end by an official act of prorogation. In either event, the effect of prorogation is generally the clearing of all outstanding matters before the legislature.

Common procedure
Historically, each session of a parliament would last less than one year, ceasing with a prorogation during which legislators could return to their constituencies.  In more recent times, development in transportation technology has permitted these individuals to journey with greater ease and frequency from the legislative capital to their respective electoral districts (sometimes called ridings, electorate, division) for short periods, meaning that parliamentary sessions typically last for more than one year, though the length of sessions varies.  Legislatures plan their business within a legislative calendar, which lays out how bills will proceed before a session ceases, although related but unofficial affairs may be conducted by legislators outside a session or during a session on days in which parliament is not meeting.

While a parliament is prorogued, between two legislative sessions, the legislature is still constitutedi.e. no general election takes place and all Members of Parliament thus retain their seats. In many legislatures, prorogation causes all orders of the bodybills, motions, etc.to be expunged. Prorogations should thus not be confused with recesses, adjournments, or holiday breaks from legislation, after which bills can resume exactly where they left off. In the United Kingdom, however, the practice of terminating all bills upon prorogation has slightly altered; public bills may be re-introduced in the next legislative session, and fast-tracked directly to the stage they reached in the prorogued legislative session.

A new session will often begin on the same day that the previous session ended. In most cases, when parliament reconvenes for a new legislative session, the head of state, or a representative thereof, will address the legislature in an opening ceremony.

In both parliamentary and presidential systems, sessions are referred to by the name of the body and an ordinal numberfor example, the 2nd Session of the 39th Canadian Parliament or the 1st Session of the 109th United States Congress.

Purposes
Governments today end sessions whenever it is most convenient, but a “good faith exercise of the power” to prorogue parliament does not include preventing it from frustrating the prime minister's agenda. When the Parliament of the Kingdom of Italy conquered the power to decide on its recalling, the MP Modigliani spoke of a coup d'état, if the right to prorogue or close the session was exercised immediately after Parliament had recalled itself.

During the electoral campaign, this break takes place so as to prevent the upper house from sitting and to purge all upper chamber business before the start of the next legislative session. It is not uncommon for a session of parliament to be put into recess during holidays and then resumed a few weeks later exactly where it left off.

Procedure in Commonwealth realms

In Commonwealth realms, legislative sessions can last from a few weeks to over a year; between general elections; there are usually anywhere from one to six sessions of parliament before a dissolution by either the Crown-in-Council or the expiry of a legally mandated term limit. Each session begins with a speech from the throne, read to the members of both legislative chambers either by the reigning sovereign or a viceroy or other representative. Houses of parliament in some realms will, following this address, introduce a pro forma bill as a symbol of the right of parliament to give priority to matters other than the monarch's speech (always written by the cabinet of the day).

United Kingdom

In the parliament of the United Kingdom, prorogation is immediately preceded by a speech to both legislative chambers, with procedures similar to the Throne Speech. The monarch usually approves the oration—which recalls the prior legislative session, noting major bills passed and other functions of the government—but rarely delivers it in person, Queen Victoria being the last to do so. Instead, the speech is presented by the Lords Commissioners and read by the Leader of the House of Lords. When King Charles I dissolved the Parliament of England in 1628, after the Petition of Right, he gave a prorogation speech that effectively cancelled all future meetings of the legislature, at least until he again required finances.

Australia

Prior to 1977, it was common for the federal Parliament to have up to three sessions, with Parliament being prorogued at the end of each session and recalled at the beginning of the next. This was not always the case, for instance the 10th Parliament (1926–1928) went full term without prorogation. The practice of having multiple sessions in the same parliament gradually fell into disuse, and all parliaments from 1978 to 2013 had a single session. (There were only four prorogations since 1961, twice to allow the visiting Queen to "open" Parliament, once after the 1967 death of Prime Minister Harold Holt and for political reasons in 2016.) Since 1990, it has been the practice for the parliament to be prorogued on the same day that the House is dissolved so that the Senate will not be able to sit during the election period.

However, on 21 March 2016, Prime Minister Malcolm Turnbull announced that the 44th Parliament, elected in 2013, would be prorogued on 15 April and that a second session would begin on 18 April. Prorogation is now a procedural device, the effect of which is to call the Parliament back on a particular date (especially the Senate, which the government did not control), and to wipe clean all matters before each House, without triggering an election.

Canada

In the Parliament of Canada and its provinces, the legislature is typically prorogued upon the completion of the agenda set forth in the Speech from the Throne (called the legislative programme in the UK). It remains in recess until the monarch, governor general, or lieutenant governor summons parliamentarians again. Historically, long prorogations allowed legislators to spend part of their year in the capital city and part in their home ridings. However, this reason has become less important with the advent of rapid transcontinental travel.

More recently, prorogations have triggered speculation that they were advised by the sitting prime minister for political purposes: for example, in the 40th Parliament, the first prorogation occurred in the midst of a parliamentary dispute, in which the opposition parties expressed intent to defeat the minority government, and the second was suspected by opposition Members of Parliament to be a way to avoid investigations into the Afghan detainees affair and triggered citizen protests. In October 2012, the provincial legislature of Ontario was prorogued under similar circumstances, allegedly to avoid scrutiny of the provincial Government on a number of issues.

Bills are numbered within each session. For example, in the federal House of Commons each session's government bills are numbered from C-2 to C-200, and the numbering returns again to C-2 following a prorogation (Bill C-1 is a pro-forma bill).

Procedure in the United States 

In the United States, some state legislatures meet only part of the year. Depending upon limitations of the state's constitution, if business arises that must be addressed before the next regular session, the governor may call a special session.

The US Congress is renewed every two years as required by the US Constitution, with all members of the House of Representatives up for reelection and one-third of the members of the US Senate up for reelection. (Senators serve a six-year term; House members serve a two-year term). Each Congress sits in two sessions lasting approximately one year.  Thus, the 1st session of the 114th Congress commenced on January 3, 2015, and the 2nd session commenced on January 3, 2016, with the same members and no intervening election. All legislative business, however, is cleared at the end of each session.  It is common for bills to be reintroduced in the second session that were not passed in the first session, and the restrictions on reconsideration only apply to a single session.

When the leaders of the majority party in each house have determined that no more business will be conducted by that house during that term of Congress, a motion is introduced to adjourn sine die, effectively dissolving that house.  Typically, this is done at some point after the general congressional election in November of even-numbered years.  If the party in power is retained, it may happen as early as mid-November and members return to their districts for the holiday season.  However, when the party in power is ousted or if important business, such as approval of appropriation bills, has not been completed, Congress will often meet in a lame-duck session, adjourning as late as December 31, before the newly elected Congress takes office on January 3.

References

External links 

 Video of Prorogation
 Canada. House of Commons. Procedure Online

Government
Political terminology
Westminster system
Time in government